Michael Stanley (born Michael Stanley Gee; March 25, 1948 – March 5, 2021) was an American singer-songwriter, musician, radio and television personality. As a solo artist and with the Michael Stanley Band (MSB), and Michael Stanley and the Resonators (MS&R) his brand of heartland rock was popular in Cleveland, Ohio, and around the American Midwest in the 1970s and 1980s.

Early life, family, and education
Michael Stanley Gee graduated from Rocky River High School in 1966. He attended Hiram College on a baseball scholarship and graduated with a bachelor's degree in 1970.

Career

Early career
While in college, Michael Stanley was in the band Silk (originally called the Tree Stumps) which released an album, Smooth As Raw Silk, on ABC Records in 1969.

A few years after his graduation, while working as a regional manager for a record store chain, Stanley released his first solo album, Michael Stanley, on Tumbleweed Records in 1973. The album was produced by Bill Szymczyk and featured contributions from Joe Walsh, Todd Rundgren, Rick Derringer, and Joe Vitale.   Its first song, "Rosewood Bitters," would become a lifetime fixture in Stanley's shows and was later recorded by Walsh in 1985.  Stanley's second solo album, Friends and Legends, released later in 1973 on MCA Records, was again produced by Szymczyk and included support from members of Barnstorm and Stephen Stills' Manassas, among others: Walsh, Vitale, Kenny Passarelli, Paul Harris, Joe Lala, Al Perkins, David Sanborn, Dan Fogelberg, and Richie Furay, with J. Geils contributing to the production.

Michael Stanley Band
The Michael Stanley Band was formed by Stanley in 1974 with singer-songwriter–lead guitarist Jonah Koslen, former Glass Harp bassist Daniel Pecchio and drummer Tommy Dobeck from the band Circus. There were several personnel changes over the years and by 1982 the group had evolved into a seven-piece band.

Nicknamed MSB by their fans, the band set several attendance records at Cleveland area venues including a record 20,320 at the Richfield Coliseum on July 20, 1979, and a record 40,529 for two Coliseum concerts on December 31, 1981, and January 1, 1982. The band's greatest achievement was a total attendance of 74,404 during a four-night stand at Blossom Music Center on August 25, 26, 30 and 31, 1982.

The group reached the peak of their popularity nationally in 1981 when the single "He Can't Love You" from the album Heartland (written and sung by keyboardist Kevin Raleigh) made the Top 40 (#33 Billboard, #27 Cash Box) and "In the Heartland" from the album North Coast went to #6 on Billboard's Top Tracks chart. Their video for "He Can't Love You" was the 47th video ever played on MTV. The band's last Top 40 hit was "My Town" in 1983.  "My Town" has been played by the Ohio State University Marching Band since 1986.  The special all-brass and percussion arrangement is a favorite in Ohio Stadium.  

The band dissolved in 1987 with a series of 12 farewell shows at the Front Row Theater in Highland Heights, Ohio (suburban Cleveland) during the 1986–87 holiday season.

In 2004, the sketch comedy troupe Last Call Cleveland produced Michael Stanley Superstar: The Unauthorized Autobiography of the Cuyahoga Messiah, a play which parodied Stanley's status as a local celebrity.

Personnel
 Michael Stanley – guitar, vocals
 Jonah Koslen – lead guitar, vocals (1974–77)
 Daniel Pecchio – bass, vocals (1974–79)
 Tommy Dobeck – drums
 Bob Pelander – keyboards (1976–87)
 Gary Markasky – lead guitar (1978–83)
 Kevin Raleigh – keyboards, vocals (1978–87)
 Michael Gismondi – bass (1979–87)
 Rick Bell – saxophone (1982–84)
 Danny Powers – lead guitar (1983–87)

Television and radio

Stanley was the co-host of PM Magazine on WJW Channel 8 from 1987 to 1990 and its follow-up Cleveland Tonight until 1991. He also appeared on The Drew Carey Show, playing himself.

Following a short stint on Cleveland radio station WMMS, from 1990 until a few weeks before his death in 2021, Stanley was the afternoon drive disc jockey for classic rock radio station WNCX, in Cleveland.

In 1993 he appeared on the Howard Stern Radio Show during one of his Birthday Shows, and played Rosewood Bitters with Joe Walsh live.

Later musical career
In addition to his broadcasting career, after the breakup of the Michael Stanley Band, Stanley continued to write songs, record, and perform with bands (often with some former members of MSB) including Michael Stanley and Friends, the Ghost Poets, the Resonators, and Midlife Chryslers.  In 2019, he estimated that the Resonators played about 25 shows per year, many of them in Northeast Ohio but also "from the East Coast to Atlanta to St. Louis."  He released about sixteen more albums on Razor & Tie or his own label, Line Level.

Personal life
Stanley was married four times: to Libby Hill Blake, a teacher, from 1970 to 1990, when they divorced; to Mary McCrone, a television producer, for eight years until they divorced in about 2000; to Denise Skinner, a former marketing staffer, from 2002 until her death of cancer in 2011; and to her best friend, Ilsa Glanzberg, an elementary school instructional aide, from 2017 until his death in 2021.  He had twin daughters, Anna and Sarah, born in 1974, and five grandchildren.

Health, and death
Stanley had a first heart attack in 1991, at age 43. In 2017, he was diagnosed with prostate cancer.  Later that year he suffered a second heart attack and underwent quadruple bypass surgery.

Stanley died in his sleep on March 5, 2021, after suffering for seven months with lung cancer.

He is buried in Lake View Cemetery in Cleveland, OH. https://www.remembermyjourney.com/Search/Cemetery/98/Map?q=Michael%20Stanley%20Gee&searchCemeteryId=98&birthYear=&deathYear=#deceased=23158715

Awards and honors
1987–1991 – either one, or "a couple," or eleven, local Emmy awards
2012 – Cleveland Association of Broadcasters Excellence in Radio Award
2019 – Cleveland Arts Prize’s Lifetime Achievement Award 
2019 – The City of Cleveland renamed a section of Huron Avenue in downtown Cleveland as Michael Stanley Way.
2021 – March 25, which would have been his 73rd birthday, declared Michael Stanley Day by the Cleveland City Council

Discography

Albums

Silk

Solo

Michael Stanley Band

The Ghost Poets

Post-MSB solo

Singles

Notes

References

Further reading

External links
 
  
 
  as Michael Stanley Gee
 

1948 births
2021 deaths
Hiram College alumni
Radio personalities from Cleveland
Musicians from Cleveland
Singer-songwriters from Ohio
Rocky River High School (Ohio) alumni
Deaths from lung cancer